Harvey Leigh Robinson (March 23, 1908 – April 25, 1979) was an American football player and coach.  He served as the head coach at the University of Tennessee for two seasons, 1953 and 1954, compiling a career record of 10–10–1.  Robinson replaced General Robert Neyland, who retired as head coach due to health reasons.  Robinson then served as an assistant coach at Florida under Bob Woodruff and then returned to Knoxville to serve on the staff of Bowden Wyatt.  Robinson later became a scout for the NFL.

Head coaching record

College

References

1908 births
1979 deaths
Florida Gators football coaches
Tennessee Volunteers football coaches
Tennessee Volunteers football players
High school football coaches in Tennessee
People from Buncombe County, North Carolina